Acacia oncinophylla, commonly known as hook-leaved acacia, is a shrub belonging to the genus Acacia and the subgenus Juliflorae.

Description
Like most species of Acacia it has phyllodes rather than true leaves. Thee evergreen phyllodes have a  linear or linear-oblanceolate shape and can be either straight or curved. It flowers from August to September producing yellow flowers. After flowering golden to silver coloured velvety seed pods form that have a linear shape and are straight to very slightly curved.

Taxonomy
The species was first formally described by the botanist John Lindley in 1839.

There are two recognised subspecies:
 Acacia oncinophylla subsp. oncinophylla
 Acacia oncinophylla subsp. patulifolia

It is quite closely related to Acacia fauntleroyi which is found further the east.

Distribution
It is native to Swan Coastal Plain and South West regions of Western Australia where it is commonly situated on hills andslopes growing in granitic or lateritic soils. It is found from around Mogumber in the north and follow down the Darling Range to around Wagerup in the south often as a part of jarrah woodland communities.

See also
List of Acacia species

References

oncinophylla
Acacias of Western Australia
Plants described in 1839
Taxa named by John Lindley